Asteranthe is a genus of plants in the family Annonaceae. It comprises two species distributed in Kenya and Tanzania.

Description
Asteranthe are shrubs or small trees with hermaphroditic flowers.

Species
Species include:
 Asteranthe asterias (S. Moore) Engl. & Diels
 Asteranthe lutea Vollesen

References

 
Annonaceae genera
Flora of Africa
Taxa named by Adolf Engler
Taxa named by Ludwig Diels